Salimata Ndiaye (born 17 February 1995) is a Senegalese footballer who plays as a defender for Lycée Ameth Fall and the Senegal women's national team.

Club career
Ndiaye has played for Lycée Ameth Fall in Saint-Louis, Senegal.

International career
Ndiaye capped for Senegal at senior level during the 2022 Africa Women Cup of Nations qualification.

References

External links

1995 births
Living people
Sportspeople from Saint-Louis, Senegal
Senegalese women's footballers
Women's association football defenders
Senegal women's international footballers